Imago is the second full-length album by the Brisbane band The Butterfly Effect. It was recorded by the line-up of Clint Boge on lead vocals, Glenn Esmond on bass guitar, Kurt Goedhart on lead guitar and Ben Hall on drums, with Joe Barresi producing. It was released on 17 June 2006 and debuted on the ARIA Albums Chart at number 2, which is the group's first top 10 album.

Background
The track "Phoenix", which was released to Australian radio in 2005 prior to Imagos release, did not make the cut for the album, but appeared as a b-side on the lead single, "A Slow Descent" (June 2006).

Sound and composition
The sound of Imago is more progressive than their previous album and is less heavy. The album shows the band have all but lost their earlier nu-metal influences which has made them more popular. Clint Boge's vocals are also more refined and as a result, his range is higher and more diverse than the previous releases. The title track, "Imago", is an instrumental.

Reception
The album was listed at number 88 on the Triple J Hottest 100 Albums of All Time.

Track listing

Charts

Certifications

Personnel

Band
 Clint Boge  – lead vocals
 Kurt Goedhart  – lead guitar
 Glenn Esmond  – bass guitar
 Ben Hall  – drums

Production
Joe Barresi  – producer

References

The Butterfly Effect (band) albums
2006 albums
Albums produced by Joe Barresi